Elrose may refer to:

 Elrose, Saskatchewan, a town in Canada
 Elrose (electoral district), a former provincial electoral district in Saskatchewan
 Elrose (Lafayette, Louisiana), U.S., a historic house
 Elrose Airport, serving the Eloise Copper Mine, Queensland, Australia